In linguistics, an honorific (abbreviated ) is a grammatical or morphosyntactic form that encodes the relative social status of the participants of the conversation. Distinct from honorific titles, linguistic honorifics convey formality , social distance, politeness , humility , deference, or respect through the choice of an alternate form such as an affix, clitic, grammatical case, change in person or number, or an entirely different lexical item. A key feature of an honorific system is that one can convey the same message in both honorific and familiar forms—i.e., it is possible to say something like (as in an oft-cited example from Brown and Levinson) "The soup is hot" in a way that confers honor or deference on one of the participants of the conversation.

Honorific speech is a type of social deixis, as an understanding of the context—in this case, the social status of the speaker relative to the other participants or bystanders—is crucial to its use.

There are three main types of honorifics, categorized according to the individual whose status is being expressed:

 Addressee (or speaker/hearer)
 Referent (or speaker/referent)
 Bystander (or speaker/bystander)

Addressee honorifics express the social status of the person being spoken to (the hearer), regardless of what is being talked about. For example, Javanese has three different words for "house" depending on the status level of the person spoken to. Referent honorifics express the status of the person being spoken about. In this type of honorific, both the referent (the person being spoken about) and the target (the person whose status is being expressed) of the honorific expression are the same. This is exemplified by the T–V distinction present in many Indo-European languages, in which a different second-person pronoun (such as tu or vous in French) is chosen based on the relative social status of the speaker and the hearer (the hearer, in this case, also being the referent). Bystander honorifics express the status of someone who is nearby, but not a participant in the conversation (the overhearer). These are the least common, and are found primarily in avoidance speech such as the "mother-in-law languages" of aboriginal Australia, where one changes one's speech in the presence of an in-law or other tabooed relative.

A fourth type, the Speaker/Situation honorific, does not concern the status of any participant or bystander, but the circumstances and environment in which the conversation is occurring. The classic example of this is diglossia, in which an elevated or "high form" of a language is used in situations where more formality is called for, and a vernacular or "low form" of a language is used in more casual situations.

Politeness can be indicated by means other than grammar or marked vocabulary, such as conventions of word choice or by choosing what to say and what not to say. Politeness is one aspect of Register, which is a more general concept of choosing a particular variety of language for a particular purpose or audience.

T–V distinction in Indo-European languages

One common system of honorific speech is T–V distinction. The terms T-form and V-form to describe the second person pronouns tu and vos, respectively, were introduced by Brown and Gilman, whose 1960 study of them introduced the idea that the use of these forms was governed by "power and solidarity." The Latin tu refers to the singular T-form, while the Latin vos refers to the V-form, which is usually plural-marked.  Tu is used to express informality, and in contrast, vos is used to express politeness and formality. T–V distinction is characteristic of many Indo-European languages, including Persian, Portuguese, Polish, and Russian, as detailed below.

Brazilian Portuguese
The pronouns tu (informal) and você (more formal) fit the T–V pattern nicely, except that their use varies a great deal from region to region. For instance, in most parts of Brazil, tu is not used; whereas in the northern state of Maranhão and southern regions, it is. A third lexical option is added to the honorific scheme: o senhor and a senhora (literally meaning "sir" and "madam", which are third-person references that are used in direct address (that would "normally" require the second person tu or você). These forms are highly formal and used when speaking "upward" and always used in formal correspondence, such as in governmental letters, to authorities, customers and elders. See more discussion at Portuguese personal pronouns.

North Indian languages
North Indian languages such as Hindi, Urdu and Bengali usually have three instead of two levels of honorifics. Tu, Tum and Aap in Hindi and Urdu, or Tui, Tumi and Aapni (Bengali), indicate increasing levels of formality or social status of the addressee. Verb has to change accordingly to agree with the pronoun.

Persian
As an Indo-European language the pronouns tu (informal) and Shoma (more formal form of second-person single and also used alone for second-person plural) fit the T–V pattern except that the Name Shoma is actually a modern Persian word originating from the old Avestan Persian words  shê-Va where Va or Ve used as more formal form of second-person single and also used alone for second-person plural and shê which means for him or his. Therefore, the words shê-Va together, had been used to refer to formal form of second-male person single and also used alone for second-male person plural.

Polish

Polish has a simpler grammatical and lexical politeness incorporated into its language, in comparison to Japanese and Korean. It uses grammatical category of honorifics within certain verbs and personal pronouns; this honorific system is namely split into two basic levels – the familiar (T) and the polite (V):
ty: second-person singular, informal
on (masculine) / ona (feminine): third-person singular, informal (note that there's also neuter ono, but it is not used when referring to people except small children)
wy: second-person plural, informal
oni (used when referring to a group of men or a mixed-sex group)/one (when referring to a group of women): third-person plural
pan (male-marked) / pani (female-marked): second- and third-person singular, formal
panowie (male-marked) / panie (female-marked) / państwo (mixed gender): second- and third-person plural, formal
Sometimes panna is used for an unmarried woman, along with using different suffixes for last name, although it is mostly obsolete and can be considered condescending. Using first name alone is familiar (but not necessarily intimate, as in Japanese—it is commonly used among colleagues, for example). Using the last name alone is extremely rare and when it is employed, it is condescending, and used among school pupils and in the military. Also using Pan/Pani with surname in vocative form is rather impolite. The address in form "proszę Pana/Pani" is preferred.
Pan/Pani can be used as a prefix to a first or last name, as in the example:
Pan Karol: Mr. Karol
Pani Kowalska: Mrs./Ms. Kowalska
Pani Anna: Mrs./Ms. Anna
Which are more formal than using the typical familiar ty/on/ona, but they may imply familiarity, especially in second person. Using a prefix with the first name is almost always considered familiar and possibly rude. Using the last name with a prefix in second person can still be considered impolite. Using the set phrase proszę pana, proszę pani is preferred (and polite) when drawing attention (in a way akin to using sir in English).

In addition, there are two different V forms within the honorific usage – the more formal and the less formal form. The less formal form is more colloquial and used in daily speech more frequently. The higher honorific level includes "compound" pronouns consisting of prefixal pan or pani in conjunction with professional titles. Here are some examples (for males/females resp.):
Pan minister / Pani minister: Minister
Pan dyrektor / Pani dyrektor: Director
Pan kierowca / Pani kierowca: driver
Pan doktor / Pani doktor: doctor
These professional titles are more formal as the speaker humbles him/herself and puts the addressee at a higher rank or status. These can also be used along with a name (only last or both names), but that's extremely formal and almost never used in direct conversation.
For some professional titles (e.g. doktor, profesor), the pan/pani can be dropped, resulting in a form which is less formal, but still polite. Unlike the above, this can also precede a name (almost always last), but it is seldom used in second person.
As with pan/pani phrases such as proszę pana ministra (which can be translated "Minister, sir") can also be used for calling attention, although they are less common. The pan/pani can also be dropped with some titles in the phrase, but it is even less common and can be inappropriate.

Historical factors played a major role in shaping the Polish usage of honorifics. Poland's history of nobility was the major source for Polish politeness, which explains how the honorific male-marked pronoun pan (pani is female-marked) was derived from the old word for "lord." There are separate honorific pronouns used to address a priest (ksiądz), a nun or nurse (siostra). It is acceptable to replace siostra with pani when addressing a nurse, but it is unacceptable when speaking to a nun. Likewise, it is unacceptable to replace ksiądz with pan when speaking to a priest. The intimate T form is marked as neutral when used reciprocally between children, relatives, students, soldiers and young people.

Russian

Native Russian speakers usually know when to use the informal second person singular pronoun (ty) or the formal form (vy). The practice of being informal is known as týkan’e while the practice of being formal and polite is referred to výkan’e.

It has been suggested that the origin of vy-address came from the Roman Empire and the French due to the influence of their language and culture on the Russian aristocracy. In many other European countries, ty initially was used to address any one person or object, regardless of age and social ranking. Vy was then used to address multiple people or objects altogether. Later, after being in contact with foreigners, the second person plural pronoun acquired another function. Displaying respect and formality, it was used for addressing aristocrats – people of higher social status and power.

Another theory suggests that in Russia, the Emperor first adopted the plural vy-form. The Emperor is considered plural because he is the representation of the people. Likewise, the Emperor could refer to himself using vos (we), to represent "I and my people". From the courts, the middle and lower classes gradually adopted this usage.

The younger generation and commoners, with minimal education still address each other using ty with no connotation of disrespect, however. Certain Russians who are used to vy-address may perceive the ones who don't differentiate between ty and vy forms as uneducated, offensive and uncultured. This leads to the conclusion that this honorific was not a Russian innovation. Instead, the use of vy in both the singular and plural form is due to the exposure to the Latin historical and political developments. The usage of vy did not spread throughout the Russian population quickly; as a result, the usage was inconsistent until the eighteenth century, when Vy became more prominent in secular literature.

French
In French the singular form 'tu' is used in intimate and informal speech, as well as "speaking down", as adults to children (but never "up"). The plural form 'vous' is used to address individuals formally and in situations in which adults meet for the first time. Often people decide explicitly to break the formal by one or the other asking "on se tutoie?" (where "tutoyer" is the verb meaning to speak in the 'tu' register, its equivalent being "vouvoyer").

Also, the normally first person plural form "nous" may be used as an "humility mark" especially in formal communications like college thesis, to recognise that the work done is not the result of the single author of the thesis but comes from in a way, of all the predecessors and pairs in the realm of knowledge of the subject.

Avoidance speech

Avoidance speech, or "mother-in-law language," is the most common example of a bystander honorific. In this honorific system, a speaker switches to a different variety of speech in the presence of an in-law or other relative for whom an affinal taboo exists. These languages usually have the same phonology and grammatical structure as the standard language they derived from, but are characterized by a smaller lexical inventory than the standard language. Avoidance speech of this sort is primarily found in Australian Aboriginal languages such as Dyirbal, but can also be found in some Native American languages, including Navajo, and some Bantu languages, including Zulu.

Dyirbal

The Dyirbal language has a special avoidance speech style called Jalnguy that is used by a speaker when in the presence of the speaker's mother-in-law. This mother-in-law language has the same phonology and grammar as the everyday style, but uses an almost totally distinct set of lexemes when in the presence of the tabooed relative. This special lexicon has fewer lexemes than the everyday style and typically employs only transitive verb roots whereas everyday style uses non-cognate transitive and intransitive roots.  By using this mother-in-law language a speaker then indicates a deferential social relationship.

Guugu-Yimidhirr

In Guugu-Yimidhirr, a traditional Australian Aboriginal language, special avoidance lexemes are used to express deference when in the presence of tabooed in-law relatives. In other words, speakers will either be completely prohibited from speaking to one's mother-in-law or must employ "avoidance language" to one's brother-in-law. The brother-in-law language involves a special set of words to replace regular Guugu-Yimidhirr words and the speaker must avoid words which could suggest reference to genitalia or bodily acts. This brother-in-law language therefore indexes a deferential social relationship of the brother-in-law to the speaker and is reflected in the appropriate social behavior of Guugu-Yimidhirr society. For example, one avoids touching tabooed in-laws, looking at them, joking with them, and cursing in their presence.

Mortlockese 
The Mortlockese language uses avoidance speech between genders. In Mortlock culture, there are many restrictions and rules when interacting with people of the opposite gender, such as how only males are allowed to go fishing or how women are supposed to lower their posture in the presence of men. This avoidance speech showcases one of these restrictions/rules. This gender-restrictive vocabulary can only be used when speaking to people of the same gender. For men, this is sometimes referred to as kapsen leefalang or the speech of the cookhouse.

Other examples of honorifics

English
 Modern English has no grammatical system of honorific speech, with formality and informality being conveyed entirely by register, word choice, tone, rhetorical strategy, etc. 

Middle English once exhibited a T–V distinction between the 2nd person singular pronoun thou and the 2nd person plural ye and later you, with the latter being used as an honorific regardless of the number of addressees. Thou and its associated forms have fallen into disuse and are considered archaic, though it is often used in recreations of archaic-sounding speech.
It has also survived in some dialect forms of English, notably in some regions of Yorkshire, especially amongst the older and more rural populations. Ye usage can still be found in pockets of the east coast of North America, such as rural Newfoundland.

German
German has 'Sie' as formal and 'ihr' (pl.), & 'du' (sg.) as the informal.

Chinese

Chinese has '您'(nín) as formal 'you', & '你'(nǐ) as the informal.

Japanese

Japanese honorific speech requires either honorific morphemes to be appended to verbs and some nouns or verbs and pronouns be replaced by words that mean the same but incorporate different honorific connotations.   Japanese honorific speech is broadly referred to as keigo (literally "respectful language"), and includes three main categories according to Western linguistic theory: sonkeigo, respectful language; kensongo or kenjōgo, humble language; and teineigo, polite language.

 Sonkeigo
 raises the status of the addressee or referent (e.g. third person) in relation to the speaker
 encodes a feeling of respect
 example:  先生がそちらにお出でになる。  Sensei ga sochira ni oide ni naru.  'The teacher is going there.'
 Kenjōgo
 humbles the status of the speaker in relation to the addressee or referent
 encodes a feeling of humility
 example: 明日先生のところに伺う。  Asu sensei no tokoro ni ukagau.  'I will go to the teacher's place tomorrow.'
 Teineigo
 raises the status of the addressee or referent in relation to the speaker
 encodes politeness
 example: 先生がそちらに行きます。 Sensei ga sochira ni ikimasu.  'The teacher is going there.'

Another subcategory of keigo is bikago or bika-hyōgen, which means "word beautification" and is used to demonstrate the quality of the speaker's language. Each type of speech has its own vocabulary and verb endings.

Japanese linguist Hatsutarō Ōishi distinguishes four sources of respect as the primary reasons for using keigo:
 respecting those who have a higher social rank, extraordinary ability, or credentials
 respecting those who occupy a dominant position
 respecting those to whom one is indebted
 respect for humanity

Comparatively, a more contemporary linguistic account by functional linguist Yasuto Kikuchi posits that honorific speech is governed by social factors and psychological factors.

Some examples of what Kikuchi considers social factors include:
 the location and topic being discussed by the speaker
 whether the context is written or spoken
 interpersonal relationships between the speaker, listener, and referent (i.e. positional relationships, relative familiarity, and in-group/out-group relationships).

Some examples of what Kikuchi considers psychological factors are:
 the intention of the speaker in using polite speech
 how relative distance in relationships is understood
 how skilled the speaker is in expression.

Javanese

Speech levels, although not as developed or as complex as honorific speech found in Japanese, are but one of a complex and nuanced aspect of Javanese etiquette: etiquette governs not only speaking but, "sitting, speaking, standing, pointing, composing one's countenance" and one could add mastery of English and Western table manners.

According to Wolfowitz, as quoted in:
"The system is based on sets of precisely ranked or style-coded morphemes that are semantically equivalent but stylistically contrastive"
important is an honorific vocabulary referring to the possessions, attributes, states and actions of persons, a vocabulary that includes honorific kin terms.

The Javanese perception of this is best summarized as per Errington's anecdote of an old Javanese man explaining:
Whenever two people meet they should ask themselves: "Who is this person? Who am I? What is this person to me? Balanced against one another on a scale: this is unggah-unggah- relative value

The understanding of honorifics is heavily emphasized by speakers of Javanese. High-strata Javanese will bluntly state: "to be human is to be Javanese". Those who are "sampun Jawa" or "already Javanese" are those who have a good grasp of social interaction and stratified Javanese language and applied to foreigners as well. Children, boors, simpletons, the insane, the immoral are durung Jawa: not yet Javanese.

Javanese speech is stratified. The three levels are:
Ngoko is the common "everyday" speech.
Krama is known as the polite and formal style.  Krama is divided into two other categories:
Krama Madya: semi-polite and semi-formal
Krama Inggil: fully polite and formal
"Krama" is pronounced as [krɔmɔ]

All these categories are ranked according to age, rank, kinship relations, and "intimacy."

If a speaker is uncertain about the addressee's age or rank, they commence with krama inggil and adapt their speech strata according to the highest level of formality, moving down to lower levels.  Krama is usually learned from parents and teachers, and Ngoko is usually learned from interacting with peers at a younger age.

Javanese women are expected to address their husbands in front of others, including their children in a respectful manner. Such speech pattern is especially more pronounced in areas where arranged marriage are prominent and within households where the husband is considerably older than the wife. Husbands generally address their wives by their first name, pet name, or "younger sibling" (dhik or mbak lik) while wives generally address their husbands as "elder brother" (mas).

High-strata children are expected to speak in krama inggil to both father and mother. This is less reinforced as the social strata descends, to the point of being near non-existent especially among the modern working class strata who may have the necessity of both parents working.
At this point grandparents take the role of educating the children to correct language usage.

Women are considered the custodians of language and culture within the household.

Korean

Korean honorific speech is a mixture of subject honorification, object exaltation, and the various speech levels. Depending on how these three factors are used, the speaker highlights different aspects of the relationship between the speaker, the subject, and the listener (who may also be the subject).

Korean honorifics can be added to nouns, adjectives, and verbs, and honorific styles of address may also be used. Korean pronouns may be dropped, or may be used in formal, familiar, or humble forms. Seven Korean speech levels can be used (though some are archaic) to express the level of politeness and formality to the audience. Each has its own set of verb endings.

The six commonly used speech styles from lowest to highest are:
 plain style (haerache or 해라체)
 formal
 signals more social distance between the speaker and addressee than that when using intimate style
 generally used when writing for a general audience
 generally used in written language, but when it used in spoken language, it represents admiration.
 banmal or intimate style (haeche or 해체)
 informal
 typically used with close friends, by parents to their children, by a relatively older speaker to a child, by children to children, or by youngsters to the same-ages.
 recently, many children use banmal to their parents.
 familiar style (hageche or 하게체)
 more formal than banmal style
 signals that the speaker will treat the listener with consideration and courtesy
 typically used when the addressee is below the speaker in age or social rank (e.g. the speaker is at least thirty years old and the addressee is of college age)
 The familiar style generally implies the speaker is showing authority therefore typically requires the speaker to be sufficiently mature.
 Women seldom use familiar style because it is commonly associated with male authority.
 Generally, it is used by senior citizens, getting out of use by most of people in everyday language.
 semiformal or blunt style (haoche or 하오체)
 more formal than familiar style with neutral politeness
 used to address someone in an inferior position (e.g. age or social rank)
 A speaker will use semiformal style with a stranger whose social rank is clear but not particularly lower compared to the speaker.
 It is generally used by senior citizens, getting out of used by most of people in everyday language.
 When semiformal style is used by young people, it also represents humorous sense, and is thought to be unsuitable for serious situations.
 polite style (haeyoche or 해요체)
 informal but polite.
 typically used when the addressee is a superior (e.g. by children to their parents, students to teachers)
 This is the most common speech style and is commonly used between strangers.
 formal or deferential style (hapshoche or 합쇼체)
 used to treat superiors with the most reserve and the most respect
 commonly used in speeches delivered to large audiences, in news reports, radio broadcasts, business, and formal discussions.
 in most of cases, books are written in plain style(herache), or formal style(hapshoche).
 In some cases, speakers will switch between polite and formal styles depending on the situation and the atmosphere that one wishes to convey.

These six speech styles are sometimes divided into honorific and non-honorific levels where the formal and polite styles are honorific and the rest are non-honorific. According to Strauss and Eun, the two honorific speech levels are "prototypically used among non-intimate adults of relatively equal rank". Comparatively, the non-honorific speech levels are typically used between intimates, in-group members, or in "downward directions of address by the speaker to his or her interlocutor."

Modern Nahuatl

The Nahuatl language, spoken in scattered communities in rural areas of Central Mexico, utilizes a system of honorific speech to mark social distance and respect. The honorific speech of the Nahuatl dialects spoken in the Malinche Volcano area of Puebla and Tlaxcala in Mexico is divided into four levels: an "intimate or subordinating" Level I; a "neutral, socially distant" or "respectful between intimates" Level II; "noble" or "reverential" Level III; and the "compadrazgo" or "maximally social distant" Level IV.

Level I is typically used by non-age-mates and non-intimates and is unmarked in terms of prefixation or suffixation of the listener and verbs. Level II is marked by the prefix on- on the verb and is used between intimates. Some Nahuatl speakers have been observed to alternate between Level I and Level II for one listener. The use of both levels is believed to show some respect or to not subordinate the listener. Level III is marked by the prefix on-, the reflexive prefix mo-, and an appropriate transitivizing suffix based on the verb stem. Verbs in Level III may additionally be marked with the reverential suffix –tzinōa. Finally, Level IV is typically used between people who share a ritual kinship relationship (e.g. parent with godparent, godparent with godparent of the same child). Level IV is marked by a proclitic (i.e. word that depends on the following word and works similarly to an affix, such as the word "a" or "an" in English) ma. Another important aspect of Level IV is that it addresses the listener in 3rd person whereas Level I through III all use 2nd person forms. By using this 3rd person form, maximal social distance is achieved.

Mortlockese 
The Mortlockese language is an Austronesian language spoken primarily on the Mortlock islands in Micronesia. In Mortlock culture, there is a hierarchy with chiefs called samwool. When speaking to these chiefs or to anyone of higher status, one must use honorifics (in Mortlockese called kapas pwéteete or kapas amáfel) in order to convey respect. In the Mortlockese Language, there are only two levels of speaking - common language and respectful language(honorifics). While respectful language is used when speaking to people of higher status, common language is used when speaking to anyone of the same or lesser status. One example showing the difference between respectful and common language can be seen in the word sleep. The word for sleep using common language is maúr while the word for sleep using respectful language is saipash. Along with the respectful language, there are formal greetings called tiirou or fairo that are used in meetings and gatherings. In English, some examples of formal greetings would be "good evening" or "it's a pleasure to meet you" or "how are you." These formal greetings not only use words, but also gestures. It is the combination of the words and gestures that create the tiirou or fairo(formal greeting). In English a formal greeting like this would be like saying "nice to meet you" while offering a handshake.

Pohnpeian

In Pohnpeian, honorific speech is especially important when interacting with chiefs and during Christian church services. Even radio announcements use honorifics, specifically bystander honorifics, because a chief or someone of higher status could potentially be listening. Pohnpeian honorific speech consists of:
status-lowering (humiliative) speech
status-raising (exaltive) speech
Honorific speech is usually performed through the choice of verbs and possessive classifier. There are only status-raising nouns but none for status lowering; there are only status-lowering pronouns but none for status-raising.

The construction of possessive classifiers depends on ownership, temporality, degrees of control, locative associations, and status. In addition to status-rising and status-lowering possessive classifiers, there are also common (non-status marked) possessive classifiers. Status-rising and status-lowering possessive classifiers have different properties of control and temporality. Common possessive classifiers are divided into three main categories – relatives, personal items, and food/drink.

Given that rank is inherited matrilineally, maternal relatives have specific classifiers, but paternal relatives do not. Personal items that are in close contact with the higher ranks are marked with honorific language. Food is related to social ranking; there is a hierarchy of food distribution. The best share of food is first distributed to the chief and people of higher status. In possessive constructions, food is linked to low-status possession, but not as heavily link to high-status possession. Tungoal ("food/eating") is used for all categories of low-status possessives; however, the most widely used high-status classifier, sapwelline ("land/hand") is not semantically connected to food. There are separate terms for food of high-status people – koanoat, pwenieu, and sak. On Pohnpei, it is also important to follow a specific order of serving food. The higher-ranked people eat first, both in casual family settings and community events. The lower-status people receive the "leftovers" or the weaker portion.

Thai

Wuvulu-Aua
In Wuvulu grammar, the honorific dual is used to convey respect, especially towards in-laws. The second person dual pronoun, amurua literally translates to 'you two', but can also be used as an honorific to address one. This communicates to the individual being spoken to is worth the respect of two individuals. It is undocumented if there are other honorifics greater than this one.

Ex.     Mafufuo, meru. (Good Morning, you two)

Note: Meru is the shortened version of amurua

This sentence can be used to speak with one or two people.

See also
 Deixis
 Hedge (linguistics)
 Indexicality
 Pragmatics
 Politeness

Notes

References
 Brown, Penelope and Levinson, Stephen C. 1987. Politeness: Some Universals in Language. Cambridge, England: Cambridge University Press.
 Frawley, William. 1992. Linguistic Semantics. Lawrence Erlbaum.
 Levinson, Stephen C. 1983. Pragmatics. Cambridge, England: Cambridge University Press.
 Sifianou, Maria. 1999. Politeness Phenomena in England and Greece. Oxford University Press.

Sociolinguistics
Pragmatics

Linguistics terminology